Tisha Lea Venturini-Hoch (born March 3, 1973) is a former American soccer player and current National Spokesperson for Produce for Better Health. She is a gold medalist in the 1996 Atlanta Olympics, and a world champion in the 1999 FIFA Women's World Cup held in the U.S.

Early life and youth career
She was born in Modesto, California and attended Grace M. Davis High School.

She attended University of North Carolina, and played for the Tar Heels women's soccer team. As a Tar Heels team member, she was NCAA Champion in 1991, 1992, 1993 and 1994. She won the Honda Sports Award as the nation's top soccer player in 1995.

Career

Venturini played professional soccer in the W-League for San Jose CyberRays, Delaware Genies and Bay Area CyberRays.

Venturini is the only athlete in any sport to ever hold all five titles as 
1) a Collegiate Champion at University of North Carolina, 
2) a four-time NCAA National Champion at University of North Carolina,
3) a World Cup Champion in 1999,
4) an Olympic Gold Medalist in 1996,
5) a Professional Champion at Bay Area CyberRays in 2001.

International career
During her career, Venturini represented the United States of America in 132 matches, and scored 44 goals. She currently holds the tenth rank among American women top goal scorers. She was awarded a gold medal at the 1996 Summer Olympics in Atlanta, and was a World Champion at the 1999 FIFA Women's World Cup hosted by U.S.A.
Venturini with her team finished third place in Sweden 1995 World Cup.

Matches and goals scored at World Cup and Olympic tournaments
In two FIFA Women's World Cup: Sweden 1995 and USA 1999; and one Olympics: Atlanta 1996 Tisha Venturini played 13 matches and scored 7 goals.

International goals

Coaching career
Venturini partnered with former national team players Mia Hamm and Kristine Lilly to develop the TeamFirst Soccer Academy. TeamFirst conducts youth soccer camps throughout the United States.

Personal life
Venturini likes to ski, read,  and play cards.

References

Match Reports

External links
 Tisha Venturini Soccer Camp

1973 births
Living people
Sportspeople from Modesto, California
Soccer players from California
American people of Italian descent
American women's soccer players
Footballers at the 1996 Summer Olympics
Olympic gold medalists for the United States in soccer
FIFA Century Club
1995 FIFA Women's World Cup players
1999 FIFA Women's World Cup players
FIFA Women's World Cup-winning players
Women's association football midfielders
Medalists at the 1996 Summer Olympics
United States women's international soccer players
North Carolina Tar Heels women's soccer players
Hermann Trophy women's winners
San Jose CyberRays players
Women's United Soccer Association players